George Peterson Abbey (born 20 October 1978) is a former Nigeria international footballer who played as a defender.

Starting his career with Sharks, in 1999 he moved to England to play for Macclesfield Town. After five years at Town, he signed with Port Vale in December 2004. He moved on to Crewe Alexandra in summer 2007, and left the club after a two-year stay. In 2010, he moved to Cyprus to play for Akritas Chlorakas. He was in the Nigeria squad for the third-place finish in the 2004 Africa Cup of Nations.

Club career
Abbey was born to a Nigerian father and a Welsh mother. He grew up in the southern Nigerian city of Port Harcourt along with fellow footballer Joseph Yobo, who has remained his close friend since they both left the country.

After playing for Sharks F.C. in his hometown, he left for England and was signed up with Sammy McIlroy's Macclesfield Town in 1999. He played 18 games in the Third Division in 1999–2000. He featured 23 times in the 2000–01 campaign, and made 19 appearances under David Moss in 2001–02. He scored his first goal in the Football League on 15 April 2003, in a 3–2 win over Shrewsbury Town at Gay Meadow. Abbey played 24 games in 2002–03, as Macclesfield finished just six points clear of the relegation zone. He featured 30 times in the 2003–04 campaign, as he helped the "Silkmen" to finish three places and seven points above relegated Carlisle United. He played a total of 117 league and cup games for Macclesfield, before being released by manager Brian Horton in the summer.

Abbey was reported to be looking to sign for a Premier League club, but instead he was signed up by League One side Port Vale in December 2004. He played 18 times in the 2004–05 season, helping Vale to avoid relegation into League Two by a five-point margin. He featured 22 times in the 2005–06 season. Abbey played 31 games in 2006–07, scoring in a 2–1 defeat to rivals Crewe Alexandra at Gresty Road on 4 November. He released by manager Martin Foyle in May 2007.

He joined Crewe Alexandra at the end of July 2007. He featured 23 times for Steve Holland's "Railwaymen" in 2007–08, and signed a two-year contract at the end of the season. However, he played just seven times for new boss Guðjón Þórðarson, and agreed to have his contract terminated in May 2009. Abbey underwent a trial at Tranmere Rovers, playing in pre-season friendlies against Cammell Laird, Preston North End and Liverpool. However, due to Rovers financial difficulties, they were unable to offer Abbey a permanent contract.

In 2010, he joined Akritas Chlorakas in the Cypriot Second Division. He stayed for the 2010–11 season before retiring from football to become a fitness trainer.

International career
Abbey was part of the Nigeria squad that participated at the 2004 Africa Cup of Nations held in Tunisia, thanks in part to a close relationship with Everton player Joseph Yobo, with whom he offered advice to when deciding whether to move to Everton. The "Super Eagles" lost to Tunisia at the semi-final stage, before beating Mali 2–1 to claim third-place. He was not called up to the 2006 Africa Cup of Nations, to his great disappointment.

Career statistics

Club statistics

International statistics

Honours
Nigeria
Africa Cup of Nations third-place: 2004

References

1978 births
Living people
Sportspeople from Port Harcourt
Footballers from Rivers State
Nigerian footballers
Nigeria international footballers
Association football defenders
Sharks F.C. players
Nigerian people of Welsh descent
Expatriate footballers in England
Nigerian expatriate sportspeople in England
Macclesfield Town F.C. players
Port Vale F.C. players
Crewe Alexandra F.C. players
Nigerian expatriate footballers
Expatriate footballers in Cyprus
Nigerian expatriate sportspeople in Cyprus
Akritas Chlorakas players
Cypriot Second Division players
English Football League players
2004 African Cup of Nations players